Robert E. Jackson was the mayor of Largo, Florida. He was first elected to Largo City Commission in 1974, Mayor Jackson served nine terms as City Commissioner before being elected as Mayor in 2000 and being re-elected in 2003. He lost narrowly in a bitterly contested race against Largo's first woman mayor, Patricia Gerard.

He has a Ph.D. in education from the University of South Florida and he served as the principal for Southside Fundamental Middle School from which he retired in 1997.

In 2007, Jackson was honored by the Caregiving Youth Project of Pinellas, and he was interviewed on The Daily Show after Stanton, a city manager in Largo, was fired following the announcement of his intention to undergo sexual reassignment surgery.

In 2009, Jackson failed to sign a loyalty oath as part of his application to qualify as a candidate for Mayor. The omission was not noticed until after the deadline of August 13 had based. Jackson's name was removed from the ballot over his objections, but he declined to pursue the matter in court.

References

Florida city council members
Living people
University of South Florida alumni
People from Largo, Florida
Year of birth missing (living people)
Mayors of places in Florida